Salimabad (also Romanized as Salīmābād) is a village in Kelarestaq-e Sharqi Rural District, in the Central District of Chalus County, Mazandaran Province, Iran. At the 2006 census, its population was 231, in 66 families.

References 

Populated places in Chalus County